Mandra–Chakwal Road (Punjabi) is a provincially maintained highway in Punjab that extends from Mandra to Chakwal. The route is generally rural, passing near several communities including Dhudial, Jatli and Syed Kasran. The northern terminus at Mandra merges with the N-5 National Highway while the southern terminus ends at Tehsil Chowk in Chakwal with Talagang-Chakwal Road, Sohawa Chakwal Road and Chakwal-Jhelum Road. On 6 September 2012, Prime Minister Raja Pervez Ashraf laid the foundation for the reconstruction of the Mandra–Chakwal Road. The contract was hastily awarded to the National Logistics Cell (NLC). As of 2019, the project is complete.

See also
 Provincial Highways of Punjab
 Roads in Pakistan

References

External links
 National Highway Authority

Highways in Punjab
Roads in Punjab, Pakistan
Chakwal District